Sakhalin (Karafuto; ; Manchu: ᠰᠠᡥᠠᠯᡳᠶᠠᠨ, Sahaliyan; Orok: Бугата на̄, Bugata nā; Nivkh: Yh-mif) is the largest island of Russia. It is north of the Japanese archipelago, and is administered as part of the Sakhalin Oblast. Sakhalin is in the Pacific Ocean, sandwiched between the Sea of Okhotsk to the east and the Sea of Japan to the west. It is located just off Khabarovsk Krai, and is north of Hokkaido. The island has a population of roughly 500,000, the majority of whom are Russians. The indigenous peoples of the island are the Ainu, Oroks, and Nivkhs, who are now present in very small numbers.

The island's name is derived from the Manchu word Sahaliyan (ᠰᠠᡥᠠᠯᡳᠶᠠᠨ). Sakhalin was once part of China during the Qing dynasty, although Chinese control was relaxed at times. Sakhalin was later claimed by both Russia and Japan over the course of the 19th and 20th centuries. These disputes sometimes involved military conflicts and divisions of the island between the two powers. In 1875, Japan ceded its claims to Russia in exchange for the northern Kuril Islands. In 1905, following the Russo-Japanese War, the island was divided, with Southern Sakhalin going to Japan. Russia has held all of the island since seizing the Japanese portion in the final days of World War II in 1945, as well as all of the Kurils. Japan no longer claims any of Sakhalin, although it does still claim the southern Kuril Islands. Most Ainu on Sakhalin moved to Hokkaido,  to the south across the La Pérouse Strait, when Japanese civilians were displaced from the island in 1949.

Etymology

The Manchus called it "Sahaliyan ula angga hada" (Island at the Mouth of the Black River) . Sahaliyan, the word that has been borrowed in the form of "Sakhalin", means "black" in Manchu, ula means "river" and sahaliyan ula ("Black River") is the proper Manchu name of the Amur River.

The island was also called "Kuye Fiyaka". The word "Kuye" used by the Qing is "most probably related to kuyi, the name given to the Sakhalin Ainu by their Nivkh and Nanai neighbors." When the Ainu migrated onto the mainland, the Chinese described a "strong Kui (or Kuwei, Kuwu, Kuye, Kugi, i.e. Ainu) presence in the area otherwise dominated by the Gilemi or Jilimi (Nivkh and other Amur peoples)." Related names were in widespread use in the region, for example the Kuril Ainu called themselves koushi.

History

Early history

Humans lived on Sakhalin in the Neolithic Stone Age. Flint implements such as those found in Siberia have been found at Dui and Kusunai in great numbers, as well as polished stone hatchets similar to European examples, primitive pottery with decorations like those of the Olonets, and stone weights used with fishing nets. A later population familiar with bronze left traces in earthen walls and kitchen-middens on Aniva Bay.

Indigenous people of Sakhalin include the Ainu in the southern half, the Oroks in the central region, and the Nivkhs in the north.

Yuan and Ming tributaries

After the Mongols conquered the Jin dynasty (1234), they suffered raids by the Nivkh and Udege peoples. In response, the Mongols established an administration post at Nurgan (present-day Tyr, Russia) at the junction of the Amur and Amgun rivers in 1263, and forced the submission of the two peoples.

From the Nivkh perspective, their surrender to the Mongols essentially established a military alliance against the Ainu who had invaded their lands. According to the History of Yuan, a group of people known as the Guwei (the Nivkh name for Ainu), from Sakhalin invaded and fought with the Jilimi (Nivkh people) every year. On 30 November 1264, the Mongols attacked the Ainu. The Ainu resisted Mongol rule and rebelled in 1284, but by 1308 had been subdued. They paid tribute to the Mongol Yuan dynasty at posts in Wuliehe, Nanghar, and Boluohe.

The Chinese Ming dynasty of 1368 to 1644 placed Sakhalin under its "system for subjugated peoples" (ximin tizhi). From 1409 to 1411 the Ming established an outpost called the Nurgan Regional Military Commission near the ruins of Tyr on the Siberian mainland, which continued operating until the mid-1430s. There is some evidence that the Ming eunuch Admiral Yishiha reached Sakhalin in 1413 during one of his expeditions to the lower Amur, and granted Ming titles to a local chieftain.

The Ming recruited headmen from Sakhalin for administrative posts such as commander, assistant commander, and "official charged with subjugation". In 1431 one such assistant commander, Alige, brought marten pelts as tribute to the Wuliehe post. In 1437 four other assistant commanders (Zhaluha, Sanchiha, Tuolingha, and Alingge) also presented tribute. According to the Ming Shilu, these posts, like the position of headman, were hereditary and passed down the patrilineal line. During these tributary missions, the headmen would bring their sons, who later inherited their titles. In return for tribute, the Ming awarded them with silk uniforms.

Nivkh women in Sakhalin married Han Chinese Ming officials when the Ming took tribute from Sakhalin and the Amur river region.

Qing tributary 

The Manchu Qing dynasty which came to power in China in 1644 called Sakhalin "Kuyedao (Simplified Chinese: 库页岛, Kùyè dăo)" (the island of the Ainu) or "Kuye Fiyaka". The Manchus called it "Sagaliyan ula angga hada" (Island at the Mouth of the Black River). The Qing first asserted influence over Sakhalin after the 1689 Treaty of Nerchinsk, which defined the Stanovoy Mountains as the border between the Qing and the Russian Empires. In the following year the Qing sent forces to the Amur estuary and demanded that the residents, including the Sakhalin Ainu, pay tribute. To enforce its influence, the Qing sent soldiers and mandarins across Sakhalin, reaching most parts of the island except the southern tip. The Qing imposed a fur-tribute system on the region's inhabitants.

The Qing dynasty established an office in Ningguta, situated midway along the Mudan River, to handle fur from the lower Amur and Sakhalin. Tribute was supposed to be brought to regional offices, but the lower Amur and Sakhalin were considered too remote, so the Qing sent officials directly to these regions every year to collect tribute and to present awards. In 1732, 6 hala, 18 gasban, and 148 households were registered as tribute bearers in Sakhalin. During the reign of the Qianlong Emperor (r. 1735–95), a trade post existed at Delen, upstream of Kiji Lake, according to Rinzo Mamiya. There were 500–600 people at the market during Mamiya's stay there.

Local native Sakhalin chiefs had their daughters taken as wives by Manchu officials as sanctioned by the Qing dynasty when the Qing exercised jurisdiction in Sakhalin and took tribute from them.

Japanese exploration and colonization 

In 1635 Matsumae Kinhiro, the second daimyō of Matsumae Domain in Hokkaidō, sent Satō Kamoemon and Kakizaki Kuroudo on an expedition to Sakhalin. One of the Matsumae explorers, Kodō Shōzaemon, stayed in the island in the winter of 1636 and sailed along the east coast to Taraika (now Poronaysk) in the spring of 1637.

In an early colonization attempt, a Japanese settlement was established at Ōtomari on Sakhalin's southern end in 1679. Cartographers of the Matsumae clan drew a map of the island and called it "Kita-Ezo" (Northern Ezo, Ezo being the old Japanese name for the islands north of Honshu).

In the 1780s the influence of the Japanese Tokugawa Shogunate on the Ainu of southern Sakhalin increased significantly. By the beginning of the 19th century, the Japanese economic zone extended midway up the east coast, to Taraika. With the exception of the Nayoro Ainu located on the west coast in close proximity to China, most Ainu stopped paying tribute to the Qing dynasty. The Matsumae clan was nominally in charge of Sakhalin, but they neither protected nor governed the Ainu there. Instead they extorted the Ainu for Chinese silk, which they sold in Honshu as Matsumae's special product. To obtain Chinese silk, the Ainu fell into debt, owing much fur to the Santan (Ulch people), who lived near the Qing office. The Ainu also sold the silk uniforms (mangpao, bufu, and chaofu) given to them by the Qing, which made up the majority of what the Japanese knew as nishiki and jittoku. As dynastic uniforms, the silk was of considerably higher quality than that traded at Nagasaki, and enhanced Matsumae prestige as exotic items. Eventually the Tokugawa government, realizing that they could not depend on the Matsumae, took control of Sakhalin in 1807.

Japan proclaimed sovereignty over Sakhalin in 1807, and in 1809 Mamiya Rinzō claimed that it was an island.

The Santan Japanese traders seized Rishiri Ainu women when they were trading in Sakhalin to become their wives.

European exploration 

The first European known to visit Sakhalin was Martin Gerritz de Vries, who mapped Cape Patience and Cape Aniva on the island's east coast in 1643. The Dutch captain, however, was unaware that it was an island, and 17th-century maps usually showed these points (and often Hokkaido as well) as part of the mainland. As part of a nationwide Sino-French cartographic program, Jesuits Jean-Baptiste Régis, Pierre Jartoux, and Xavier Ehrenbert Fridelli joined a Chinese team visiting the lower Amur (known to them under its Manchu name, Sahaliyan Ula, i.e. the "Black River"), in 1709, and learned of the existence of the nearby offshore island from the Ke tcheng natives of the lower Amur.

The Jesuits did not have a chance to visit the island, and the geographical information provided by the Ke tcheng people and Manchus who had been to the island was insufficient to allow them to identify it as the land visited by de Vries in 1643. As a result, many 17th-century maps showed a rather strangely shaped Sakhalin, which included only the northern half of the island (with Cape Patience), while Cape Aniva, discovered by de Vries, and the "Black Cape" (Cape Crillon) were thought to form part of the mainland.

Only with the 1787 expedition of Jean-François de La Pérouse did the island began to resemble something of its true shape on European maps. Though unable to pass through its northern "bottleneck" due to contrary winds, La Perouse charted most of the Strait of Tartary, and islanders he encountered near today's Strait of Nevelskoy told him that the island was called "Tchoka" (or at least that is how he recorded the name in French), and "Tchoka" appears on some maps thereafter.

19th century

Russo-Japanese rivalry 

On the basis of its belief that it was an extension of Hokkaido, both geographically and culturally, Japan again proclaimed sovereignty over the whole island (as well as the Kuril Islands chain) in 1845, in the face of competing claims from Russia. In 1849, however, the Russian navigator Gennady Nevelskoy recorded the existence and navigability of the strait later given his name, and Russian settlers began establishing coal mines, administration facilities, schools, and churches on the island. In 1853–54, Nikolay Rudanovsky surveyed and mapped the island.

In 1855, Russia and Japan signed the Treaty of Shimoda, which declared that nationals of both countries could inhabit the island: Russians in the north, and Japanese in the south, without a clearly defined boundary between. Russia also agreed to dismantle its military base at Ootomari. Following the Opium War, Russia forced China to sign the Treaty of Aigun (1858) and the Convention of Peking (1860), under which China lost to Russia all claims to territories north of Heilongjiang (Amur) and east of Ussuri.

In 1857 the Russians established a penal colony. The island remained under shared sovereignty until the signing of the 1875 Treaty of Saint Petersburg, in which Japan surrendered its claims in Sakhalin to Russia. In 1890 the distinguished author Anton Chekhov visited the penal colony on Sakhalin and published a memoir of his journey.

Division along 50th parallel 

Japanese forces invaded and occupied Sakhalin in the closing stages of the Russo-Japanese War. In accordance with the Treaty of Portsmouth of 1905, the southern part of the island below the 50th parallel north reverted to Japan, while Russia retained the northern three-fifths. In 1920, during the Siberian Intervention, Japan again occupied the northern part of the island, returning it to the Soviet Union in 1925.

South Sakhalin was administered by Japan as Karafuto Prefecture, with the capital at Toyohara (today's Yuzhno-Sakhalinsk). A large number of migrants were brought in from Korea.

The northern, Russian, half of the island formed Sakhalin Oblast, with the capital at Aleksandrovsk-Sakhalinsky.

Whaling 
Between 1848 and 1902, American whaleships hunted whales off Sakhalin. They cruised for bowhead and gray whales to the north and right whales to the east and south.

On June 7, 1855, the ship Jefferson (396 tons), of New London, was wrecked on Cape Levenshtern, on the northeastern side of the island, during a fog. All hands were saved as well as 300 barrels of whale oil.

Second World War 

In August 1945, after repudiating the Soviet–Japanese Neutrality Pact, the Soviet Union invaded southern Sakhalin, an action planned secretly at the Yalta Conference. The Soviet attack started on August 11, 1945, a few days before the surrender of Japan. The Soviet 56th Rifle Corps, part of the 16th Army, consisting of the 79th Rifle Division, the 2nd Rifle Brigade, the 5th Rifle Brigade and the 214 Armored Brigade, attacked the Japanese 88th Infantry Division. Although the Soviet Red Army outnumbered the Japanese by three to one, they advanced only slowly due to strong Japanese resistance. It was not until the 113th Rifle Brigade and the 365th Independent Naval Infantry Rifle Battalion from Sovetskaya Gavan landed on Tōro, a seashore village of western Karafuto, on August 16 that the Soviets broke the Japanese defense line. Japanese resistance grew weaker after this landing. Actual fighting continued until August 21. From August 22 to August 23, most remaining Japanese units agreed to a ceasefire. The Soviets completed the conquest of Karafuto on August 25, 1945 by occupying the capital of Toyohara.

Of the approximately 400,000 people – mostly Japanese and Korean – who lived on South Sakhalin in 1944, about 100,000 were evacuated to Japan during the last days of the war. The remaining 300,000 stayed behind, some for several more years.

While the vast majority of Sakhalin Japanese and Koreans were gradually repatriated between 1946 and 1950, tens of thousands of Sakhalin Koreans (and a number of their Japanese spouses) remained in the Soviet Union.

No final peace treaty has been signed and the status of four neighboring islands remains disputed. Japan renounced its claims of sovereignty over southern Sakhalin and the Kuril Islands in the Treaty of San Francisco (1951), but maintains that the four offshore islands of Hokkaido currently administered by Russia were not subject to this renunciation. Japan granted mutual exchange visas for Japanese and Ainu families divided by the change in status. Recently, economic and political cooperation has gradually improved between the two nations despite disagreements.

Recent history

On September 1, 1983, Korean Air Flight 007, a South Korean civilian airliner, flew over Sakhalin and was shot down by the Soviet Union, just west of Sakhalin Island, near the smaller Moneron Island. The Soviet Union claimed it was a spy plane; however, commanders on the ground realized it was a commercial aircraft. All 269 passengers and crew died, including a U.S. Congressman, Larry McDonald.

On 27 May 1995, the 7.0  Neftegorsk earthquake shook the former Russian settlement of Neftegorsk with a maximum Mercalli intensity of IX (Violent). Total damage was $64.1–300 million, with 1,989 deaths and 750 injured. The settlement was not rebuilt.

Geography
Sakhalin is separated from the mainland by the narrow and shallow Strait of Tartary, which often freezes in winter in its narrower part, and from Hokkaido, Japan, by the Soya Strait or La Pérouse Strait. It lies at similar latitudes to England, Wales and Ireland.

Its orography and geological structure are imperfectly known. One theory is that Sakhalin arose from the Sakhalin Island Arc. Nearly two-thirds of Sakhalin are mountainous. Two parallel ranges of mountains traverse it from north to south, reaching . The Western Sakhalin Mountains peak in Mount Ichara, while the Eastern Sakhalin Mountains's highest peak, Mount Lopatin , is also the island's highest mountain. Tym-Poronaiskaya Valley separates the two ranges. Susuanaisky and Tonino-Anivsky ranges traverse the island in the south, while the swampy Northern-Sakhalin plain occupies most of its north.

Crystalline rocks crop out at several capes; Cretaceous limestones, containing an abundant and specific fauna of gigantic ammonites, occur at Dui on the west coast; and Tertiary conglomerates, sandstones, marls, and clays, folded by subsequent upheavals, are found in many parts of the island. The clays, which contain layers of good coal and abundant fossilized vegetation, show that during the Miocene period, Sakhalin formed part of a continent which comprised north Asia, Alaska, and Japan, and enjoyed a comparatively warm climate. The Pliocene deposits contain a mollusc fauna more Arctic than that which exists at the present time, indicating that the connection between the Pacific and Arctic Oceans was probably broader than it is now.

The Poronay flows south-southeast to the Gulf of Patience or Shichiro Bay, on the southeastern coast. Three other small streams enter the wide semicircular Aniva Bay or Higashifushimi Bay at the southern extremity of the island.

The northernmost point of Sakhalin is Cape of Elisabeth on the Schmidt Peninsula, while Cape Crillon is the southernmost point of the island.

Sakhalin has two smaller islands associated with it, Moneron Island and Ush Island. Ush Island is an island off of the northern coast of Sakhalin.

Demographics

At the beginning of the 20th century, some 32,000 Russians (of whom over 22,000 were convicts) inhabited Sakhalin along with several thousand native inhabitants. In 2010, the island's population was recorded at 497,973, 83% of whom were ethnic Russians, followed by about 30,000 Koreans (5.5%). Smaller minorities were the Ainu, Ukrainians, Tatars, Yakuts and Evenks. The native inhabitants currently consist of some 2,000 Nivkhs and 750 Oroks. The Nivkhs in the north support themselves by fishing and hunting. In 2008 there were 6,416 births and 7,572 deaths.

The administrative center of the oblast, Yuzhno-Sakhalinsk, a city of about 175,000, has a large Korean minority, typically referred to as Sakhalin Koreans, who were forcibly brought by the Japanese during World War II to work in the coal mines. Most of the population lives in the southern half of the island, centered mainly around Yuzhno-Sakhalinsk and two ports, Kholmsk and Korsakov (population about 40,000 each).

The 400,000 Japanese inhabitants of Sakhalin (including the Japanized indigenous Ainu) who had not already been evacuated during the war were deported following the invasion of the southern portion of the island by the Soviet Union in 1945 at the end of World War II.

Climate

The Sea of Okhotsk ensures that Sakhalin has a cold and humid climate, ranging from humid continental (Köppen Dfb) in the south to subarctic (Dfc) in the centre and north. The maritime influence makes summers much cooler than in similar-latitude inland cities such as Harbin or Irkutsk, but makes the winters much snowier and a few degrees warmer than in interior East Asian cities at the same latitude. Summers are foggy with little sunshine.

Precipitation is heavy, owing to the strong onshore winds in summer and the high frequency of North Pacific storms affecting the island in the autumn. In contrast to interior east Asia with its pronounced summer maximum, onshore winds ensure Sakhalin has year-round precipitation with a peak in the autumn.

Flora and fauna

The whole of the island is covered with dense forests, mostly coniferous. The Yezo (or Yeddo) spruce (Picea jezoensis), the Sakhalin fir (Abies sachalinensis) and the Dahurian larch (Larix gmelinii) are the chief trees; on the upper parts of the mountains are the Siberian dwarf pine (Pinus pumila) and the Kurile bamboo (Sasa kurilensis). Birches, both Siberian silver birch (Betula platyphylla) and Erman's birch (B. ermanii), poplar, elm, bird cherry (Prunus padus), Japanese yew (Taxus cuspidata), and several willows are mixed with the conifers; while farther south the maple, rowan and oak, as also the Japanese Panax ricinifolium, the Amur cork tree (Phellodendron amurense), the spindle (Euonymus macropterus) and the vine (Vitis thunbergii) make their appearance. The underwoods abound in berry-bearing plants (e.g. cloudberry, cranberry, crowberry, red whortleberry), red-berried elder (Sambucus racemosa), wild raspberry, and spiraea.

Bears, foxes, otters, and sables are numerous, as are reindeer in the north, and musk deer, hares, squirrels, rats, and mice everywhere. The bird population is mostly the common east Siberian, but there are some endemic or near-endemic breeding species, notably the endangered Nordmann's greenshank (Tringa guttifer) and the Sakhalin leaf warbler (Phylloscopus borealoides). The rivers swarm with fish, especially species of salmon (Oncorhynchus). Numerous whales visit the sea coast, including the critically endangered Western Pacific gray whale, for which the coast of Sakhalin is the only known feeding ground. Other endangered whale species known to occur in this area are the North Pacific right whale, the bowhead whale, and the beluga whale.

Transport

Sea

Transport, especially by sea, is an important segment of the economy. Nearly all the cargo arriving for Sakhalin (and the Kuril Islands) is delivered by cargo boats, or by ferries, in railway wagons, through the Vanino-Kholmsk train ferry from the mainland port of Vanino to Kholmsk. The ports of Korsakov and Kholmsk are the largest and handle all kinds of goods, while coal and timber shipments often go through other ports. In 1999, a ferry service was opened between the ports of Korsakov and Wakkanai, Japan, and operated through the autumn of 2015, when service was suspended.

For the 2016 summer season, this route will be served by a highspeed catamaran ferry from Singapore named Penguin 33. The ferry is owned by Penguin International Limited and operated by Sakhalin Shipping Company.

Sakhalin's main shipping company is Sakhalin Shipping Company, headquartered in Kholmsk on the island's west coast.

Rail
About 30% of all inland transport volume is carried by the island's railways, most of which are organized as the Sakhalin Railway (Сахалинская железная дорога), which is one of the 17 territorial divisions of the Russian Railways.

The Sakhalin Railway network extends from Nogliki in the north to Korsakov in the south. Sakhalin's railway has a connection with the rest of Russia via a train ferry operating between Vanino and Kholmsk.

The process of converting the railways from the Japanese  gauge to the Russian  gauge began in 2004 and
was completed in 2019.
The original Japanese D51 steam locomotives were used by the Soviet Railways until 1979.

During the last years of its service, it gradually deteriorated; the service was terminated in December 2006, and the line was dismantled in 2007–2008.

Air
Sakhalin is connected by regular flights to Moscow, Khabarovsk, Vladivostok and other cities of Russia. Yuzhno-Sakhalinsk Airport has regularly scheduled international flights to Hakodate, Japan, and Seoul and Busan, South Korea. There are also charter flights to the Japanese cities of Tokyo, Niigata, and Sapporo and to the Chinese cities of Shanghai, Dalian and Harbin. The island was formerly served by Alaska Airlines from Anchorage, Petropavlovsk, and Magadan.

Fixed links
The idea of building a fixed link between Sakhalin and the Russian mainland was first put forward in the 1930s. In the 1940s, an abortive attempt was made to link the island via a  undersea tunnel. The project was abandoned under Premier Nikita Khrushchev. In 2000, the Russian government revived the idea, adding a suggestion that a 40-km (25 mile) long bridge could be constructed between Sakhalin and the Japanese island of Hokkaidō, providing Japan with a direct connection to the Eurasian railway network. It was claimed that construction work could begin as early as 2001. The idea was received skeptically by the Japanese government and appears to have been shelved, probably permanently, after the cost was estimated at as much as $50 billion.

In November 2008, Russian president Dmitry Medvedev announced government support for the construction of the Sakhalin Tunnel, along with the required regauging of the island's railways to Russian standard gauge, at an estimated cost of 300–330 billion roubles.

In July 2013, Russian Far East development minister Viktor Ishayev proposed a railway bridge to link Sakhalin with the Russian mainland. He also again suggested a bridge between Sakhalin and Hokkaidō, which could potentially create a continuous rail corridor between Europe and Japan. In 2018, president Vladimir Putin ordered a feasibility study for a mainland bridge project.

Economy

Sakhalin is a classic "primary sector of the economy" area, relying on oil and gas exports, coal mining, forestry, and fishing. Limited quantities of rye, wheat, oats, barley and vegetables grow there, although the growing season averages less than 100 days.

Following the collapse of the Soviet Union in 1991 and the subsequent economic liberalization, Sakhalin has experienced an oil boom with extensive petroleum-exploration and mining by most large oil multinational corporations. The oil and natural- gas reserves contain an estimated 14 billion barrels (2.2 km3) of oil and 2,700 km3 (96 trillion cubic feet) of gas and are being developed under production-sharing agreement contracts involving international oil- companies like ExxonMobil and Shell.

In 1996, two large consortia, Sakhalin-I and Sakhalin-II, signed contracts to explore for oil and gas off the northeast coast of the island. The two consortia were estimated to spend a combined US$21 billion on the two projects; costs had almost doubled to $37 billion as of September 2006, triggering Russian governmental opposition. The cost will include an estimated US$1 billion to upgrade the island's infrastructure: roads, bridges, waste management sites, airports, railways, communications systems, and ports. In addition, Sakhalin-III-through-VI are in various early stages of development.

The Sakhalin I project, managed by Exxon Neftegas Limited (ENL), completed a production-sharing agreement (PSA) between the Sakhalin I consortium, the Russian Federation, and the Sakhalin government. Russia is in the process of building a  pipeline across the Tatar Strait from Sakhalin Island to De-Kastri terminal on the Russian mainland. From De-Kastri, the resource will be loaded onto tankers for transport to East Asian markets, namely Japan, South Korea and China.

A second consortium, Sakhalin Energy Investment Company Ltd (Sakhalin Energy), is managing the Sakhalin II project. It has completed the first production-sharing agreement (PSA) with the Russian Federation. Sakhalin Energy will build two 800-km pipelines running from the northeast of the island to Prigorodnoye (Prigorodnoe) in Aniva Bay at the southern end. The consortium will also build, at Prigorodnoye, the first liquefied natural gas (LNG) plant to be built in Russia. The oil and gas are also bound for East Asian markets.

Sakhalin II has come under fire from environmental groups, namely Sakhalin Environment Watch, for dumping dredging material in Aniva Bay. These groups were also worried about the offshore pipelines interfering with the migration of whales off the island. The consortium has rerouted the pipeline to avoid the whale migration. After a doubling in the projected cost, the Russian government threatened to halt the project for environmental reasons. There have been suggestions that the Russian government is using the environmental issues as a pretext for obtaining a greater share of revenues from the project and/or forcing involvement by the state-controlled Gazprom. The cost overruns (at least partly due to Shell's response to environmental concerns), are reducing the share of profits flowing to the Russian treasury.

In 2000, the oil-and-gas industry accounted for 57.5% of Sakhalin's industrial output. By 2006 it is expected to account for 80% of the island's industrial output. Sakhalin's economy is growing rapidly thanks to its oil-and-gas industry.

, Gazprom had taken a 50% plus one share interest in Sakhalin II by purchasing 50% of Shell, Mitsui and Mitsubishi's shares.

In June 2021, it was announced that Russia aims to make Sakhalin Island carbon neutral by 2025.

International partnerships
 Gig Harbor, Washington, United States
 Jeju Province, South Korea

Claimed by
 Russian Empire and subsequently by the Union of Soviet Socialist Republics, 18th Century AD to September 1905
 Empire of Japan, 1905–1945
 Qing Dynasty China, 1636–1905
 Republic of China, 1911–1912
 Manchukuo, 1945–1949
 Republic of China, January 1, 1946 – October 1, 1949
 People's Republic of China, dates unknown

See also

 List of islands of Russia
 Ryugase Group – a geological formation on the island
 Winter storms of 2009–10 in East Asia

Citations

Works cited

Further reading
 Anton Chekhov, A Journey to Sakhalin (1895), including:
 Saghalien [or Sakhalin] Island (1891–1895)
 Across Siberia
 C. H. Hawes, In the Uttermost East (London, 1903). (quoted in EB1911, see below)
 Ajay Kamalakaran, Sakhalin Unplugged (Yuzhno-Sakhalinsk, 2006)
 Ajay Kamalakaran, Globetrotting for Love and Other Stories from Sakhalin Island (Times Group Books, 2017)
 
 John J. Stephan, Sakhalin: A History. Oxford: Clarendon Press, 1971.

External links

 Map of the Sakhalin Hydrocarbon Region – at Blackbourn Geoconsulting
 TransGlobal Highway – Proposed Sakhalin–Hokkaidō Friendship Tunnel
 Steam and the Railways of Sakhalin
 Maps of Ezo, Sakhalin and Kuril Islands from 1854

 
Ainu geography
Geography of Northeast Asia
Islands of Sakhalin Oblast
Islands of the Pacific Ocean
Islands of the Russian Far East
Islands of the Sea of Okhotsk
Pacific Coast of Russia
Physiographic provinces
Former Japanese colonies